Retrophyllum comptonii is a species of conifer in the family Podocarpaceae. It is found only in New Caledonia.

References

Podocarpaceae
Least concern plants
Endemic flora of New Caledonia
Taxonomy articles created by Polbot